Caraz may refer to:

Caraz, a city in the northern Peruvian Andes
Caraz (mountain), a 6025 m peak in the Cordillera Blanca range, in the northern Peruvian Andes